The 1984 United States presidential election in West Virginia took place on November 6, 1984. All 50 states and the District of Columbia, were part of the 1984 United States presidential election. West Virginia voters chose 6 electors to the Electoral College, which selected the president and vice president of the United States. West Virginia was won by incumbent United States President Ronald Reagan of California, who was running against former Vice President Walter Mondale of Minnesota. Reagan ran for a second time with incumbent Vice President and former C.I.A. Director George H. W. Bush of Texas, and Mondale ran with Representative Geraldine Ferraro of New York, the first major female candidate for the vice presidency.

The presidential election of 1984 was a very partisan election for West Virginia, with over 99% of the electorate voting for either the Democratic or Republican parties, and only five parties appearing on the ballot. Most counties turned out for Reagan except for a bloc of heavily unionized, coal-dependent counties in the southern part of the state bordering Virginia and Kentucky.

West Virginia weighed in for this election as 4% more Democratic than the national average. Reagan won the election in West Virginia by a decisive 10.6% margin. While a comfortable victory, this made West Virginia 7.6% more Democratic than the nation at large, as well as Walter Mondale's ninth-best state. West Virginia had been typically Democratic since the New Deal realignment and would remain so up until the turn of the century, when George W. Bush carried the state in 2000 by over six points despite narrowly losing the national popular vote. From 1932 through 1996, West Virginia voted Republican only in the national Republican landslides of 1956, 1972, and 1984; of the three, West Virginia weighed in as more Republican than the nation only in 1972. West Virginia would return to form as a typically Democratic state in 1988, when it was one of only ten states to support Michael Dukakis.

Mondale's greatest strength came from heavily unionized southern West Virginia, where he broke 60% in McDowell, Logan, Mingo, Boone, and Fayette Counties; he also carried a number of counties in central West Virginia and two in the Northern Panhandle. Reagan comfortably carried Kanawha County, the state's biggest county and one that was less typically Democratic at the time than some others in the state (having voted to re-elect Carter by only 0.3%), and also carried the state's other then-typically Democratic population centers, Harrison County (Clarksburg), Raleigh County (Beckley), and Monongalia County (Morgantown), by margins ranging from narrow to substantial. He won the swing population center of Cabell County (Huntington) by about the same as his national margin, and got over 2/3 of the vote in the state's largest typically Republican county, Wood County (Parkersburg). Reagan's best county was the unionist and ancestrally Republican Grant County, which no Democrat has won and which gave Reagan over 80% of its ballots. His strongest performances, in general, were in the northeast of the state, where, along with strong support from Grant and likewise unionist and ancestrally Republican Morgan County, he also did well in Hampshire and Hardy Counties, which had begun to transition from typically Democratic to typically Republican in 1968; and along the middle portion of West Virginia's river border with Ohio. Both were typically Republican-leaning regions within what was otherwise an overall Democratic state at the time.

Democratic platform
Walter Mondale accepted the Democratic nomination for presidency after pulling narrowly ahead of Senator Gary Hart of Colorado and Rev. Jesse Jackson of Illinois - his main contenders during what would be a very contentious Democratic primary. During the campaign, Mondale was vocal about reduction of government spending, and, in particular, was vocal against heightened military spending on the nuclear arms race against the Soviet Union, which was reaching its peak on both sides in the early 1980s.

Taking a (what was becoming the traditional liberal) stance on the social issues of the day, Mondale advocated for gun control, the right to choose regarding abortion, and strongly opposed the repeal of laws regarding institutionalized prayer in public schools. He also criticized Reagan for his economic marginalization of the poor, stating that Reagan's reelection campaign was "a happy talk campaign," not focused on the real issues at hand.

A very significant political move during this election: the Democratic Party nominated Representative Geraldine Ferraro to run with Mondale as Vice-President. Ferraro is the first female candidate to receive such a nomination in United States history. She said in an interview at the 1984 Democratic National Convention that this action "opened a door which will never be closed again," speaking to the role of women in politics.

Republican platform

By 1984, Reagan was very popular with voters across the nation as the President who saw them out of the economic stagflation of the early and middle 1970's, and into a period of (relative) economic stability.

The economic success seen under Reagan was politically accomplished (principally) in two ways. The first was initiation of deep tax cuts for the wealthy, and the second was a wide-spectrum of tax cuts for crude oil production and refinement, namely, with the 1980 Windfall profits tax cuts. These policies were augmented with a call for heightened military spending, the cutting of social welfare programs for the poor, and the increasing of taxes on those making less than $50,000 per year. Collectively called "Reaganomics", these economic policies were established through several pieces of legislation passed between 1980 and 1987.

These new tax policies also arguably curbed several existing tax loopholes, preferences, and exceptions, but Reaganomics is typically remembered for its trickle down effect of taxing poor Americans more than rich ones as a percentage of an individual's total income. Reaganomics has (along with legislation passed under presidents George H. W. Bush and Bill Clinton) been criticized by many analysts as "setting the stage" for economic troubles in the United States after 2007, such as the Great Recession.

Virtually unopposed during the Republican primaries, Reagan ran on a campaign of furthering his economic policies. Reagan vowed to continue his "war on drugs," passing sweeping legislation after the 1984 election in support of mandatory minimum sentences for drug possession.  Furthermore, taking a (what was becoming the traditional conservative) stance on the social issues of the day, Reagan strongly opposed legislation regarding comprehension of gay marriage, abortion, and (to a lesser extent) environmentalism, regarding the final as simply being bad for business.

Results

See also
 Presidency of Ronald Reagan

References

West Virginia
1984
1984 West Virginia elections